Cameronia was the name of three ships built for Anchor Line:

 , a passenger liner built in 1911 and sunk by German U-boat  in 1917
 , a passenger liner completed in 1920 and scrapped in 1957
 Cameronia (1973), a bulk carrier built in 1973, later trading for a number of different owners with several changes of name until scrapped in 1999

References

Ship names